Now Chaman is a village in Roshanabad Rural District, in the Central District of Gorgan County, Golestan Province, Iran. At the 2006 census, its population was 1,000, in 213 families.

References 

Populated places in Gorgan County